Zwijnaarde is a village in the municipality of Ghent, Belgium. It is known for its fair and its Zwijntjes beer. A cluster of biotech companies is located at the Zwijnaarde science park, with biotech companies such as Innogenetics, and DevGen. In 2013 at Zwijnaarde, the Flemish Institute for Biotechnology was supervising a trial of 448 poplar trees genetically engineered to produce less lignin so that they would be more suitable for conversion into biofuels.

Different youth organisations are active in Zwijnaarde, such as Jeugdhuis Chaos, Chiro Ambo and KLJ Zwijnaarde.

Notable inhabitants
 Karel van de Woestijne (1878–1929), writer
 Gilbert Declercq (1946), painter, illustrator and comic-artist

Industry
 DOMO Group, carpet manufacturer

References 

Sub-municipalities of Ghent
Populated places in East Flanders